This is a list of chancellors, vice-chancellors and presidents of RMIT University (RMIT).

From its foundation in 1887 until 1991, RMIT was a private institute. During this time its chief academic officer was known as its Principal and its chief executive officer was known as its President—whom also chaired its Council of Directors. The roles of Principal and President were merged into the single position of Vice-Chancellor and President when RMIT was made a public university in 1992 (by act of the Parliament of Victoria).  

Its Council of Directors was replaced by a Chancellery of Deputy and Pro- Vice-Chancellors and Vice-Presidents which is headed by the Vice-Chancellor and President. A board of governors known as the Council of RMIT was also created in 1992 which is chaired by the Chancellor of RMIT (a role also created in 1992) as its Governor-in-Council. The Council consists of the Chancellery, the Chair of the Academic Board and elected members drawn from as well as beyond the University community.

The Council is responsible for the "general direction and superintendence of the University". Power over all the academic and administrative affairs of RMIT is then passed to the Vice-Chancellor and President by the Council in accordance with the current Royal Melbourne Institute of Technology Act of 2010. The Vice-Chancellor is therefore responsible for the "conduct of the University's affairs in all matters".

The Vietnamese branch of RMIT also has its own President, which is a role equal to that of the President of RMIT Australia but subordinate to the role of Vice-Chancellor of RMIT.

The current Chancellor of RMIT is Ziggy Switkowski, AO. The current Interim Vice-Chancellor of RMIT and the President of RMIT Australia is Dionne Higgins. The current Chairman of RMIT Vietnam is Peter Coloe.

RMIT Australia

Chancellor

Council President (1887–1991)

 1887–1889  Francis Ormond, MLC (founder)
 1889–1899 William Kernot (brother of 1920 President Wilfred Kernot)
 1900 Joseph Nixon
 1901Frederick Bromley, MLA
 1902 C. S. Paterson
 1903 Calder Edkins Oliver
 1904 James Robb
 1905 Thomas Smith
 1906 William Embling, MLC
 1907 James Smith
 1908 Robert Solly, MLA
 1909 Stephen Barker, JP
 1910 John Lemmon, MLA
 1911  Sir Samuel Gillott, MLA
 1912 Thomas Bride
 1913 Walter Hirst Haigh
 1914 William Shearing Busby
 1915 A. G. Proudfoot
 1916 H. Burgess
 1917 R. Fiddes-Brown
 1918 Charles Gray, JP
 1919 Arthur Hogg Merrin
 1920 Wilfred Kernot, MIME (brother of 1889–1899 President William Kernot)
 1921 David Avery
 1922 Sir David Hennessy, KB
 1923 Daniel White
 1924 James Alexander Smith
 1925 E. F. Russell
 1926 Victor L. Ginn
 1927 G. A. Curtis
 1928 J. H. Bradshaw
 1929 Capt. Charles Harold Peters, MC
 1930 F. W. Trotter
 1931 Stanley Rodda (also served as Principal between 1913–1927)
 1932 A. E. Kane
 1933 Harry Goldman
 1934 J. Ash
 1935 James Stanley Rogers
 1936 Harry R. Balfour
 1937 Percy Clarey, MLC
 1938 Donald Cameron
 1939 G. R. Holland
 1940 Albert Monk
 1941 Charlie Crofts
 1942 E. Fred Ryall, JP
 1943 Andrew Campbell Ahlston
 1944–1945 Henry A.L. Allibon
 1946 Lt-Col. James G. Gillespie
 1947 Capt. W.B. Nelson
 1948 E. L. Morton
 1949 P. L. Henderson
 1950 C. W. N. Sexton
 1951 F. Peter Johns
 1952  Eric Oswald Hercus
 1953 James Ross
 1954–1955 Niel Bannatyne Lewis
 1956–1958 Leighton F. Irwin, CMG
 1959–1960 Brig. Sir Bernard Evans, DSO, ED
 1961 Sir Lewis Burne, CBE
 1962 F. G. B. May
 1963–1964 W. G. Smallman, JP
 1965–1966 L. H. "Tod" Waite
 1967–1968 John William Wood
 1969 L. E. Anderson
 1970 George Brown
 1971–1972 Clyde James Griffiths, OBE
 1973–1974 R. H. Scott
 1975–1976 Ian Permezel
 1977–1978 Evan Walker, MLC, AO
 1979–1980 John Dempster Lawson
 1981–1982 Austin Asche, AC, QC
 1983–1984 R. G. Wallace
 1985–1987 D. Race

Chancellor of RMIT (1992–present)
 1992–1994 Ivan Deveson, AO
 1995–1998 Sam Smorgon, AO
 1999–2003 Donald Mercer
 2003–2010 R. Dennis Gibson, AO
 2011–2021 Ziggy Switkowski, AO

Vice-Chancellor and President

Principals (1887–1991)
 1887–1913 Frederick Campbell
 1913–1927 Stanley Rodda (also served as President in 1931)
 1927–1952 Frank Ellis, MBE
 1952–1963 Ronald Mackay
 1967–1976 Percival Jackson, CMG, CBE
 1977–1978 Peter Whitton
 1979–1988 Brian Smith, AO
 1989–1991 David Beanland, AO

Vice-Chancellor and President of RMIT (1992–present)
 1992–2000 David Beanland, AO
 2000–2004 Ruth Dunkin
 2005–2014 Margaret Gardner, AO
 2015–2021 Martin G. Bean, CBE
 2021–present Dionne Higgins (Interim)
 From early 2022 Alec Cameron

RMIT Vietnam

President (2002–2019)
 2002–2008 Michael Mann
 2009–2011 Merilyn Liddell, AM
 2012–2014 Joyce Kirk
 2014–2019 Gael McDonald

Chairman (2019–present)
 2019–present Peter Coloe

See also
 RMIT University
 RMIT University Vietnam
 List of alumni and faculty of the Royal Melbourne Institute of Technology

References

Texts:

External links
 Vice-Chancellor and President, RMIT Australia
 President, RMIT Vietnam

 
 
Melbourne